Daljit Singh (1935 – 5 August 2009) was an Indian cricketer. He played first-class cricket for Delhi and Southern Punjab.

See also
 List of Delhi cricketers

References

External links
 

1935 births
2009 deaths
Indian cricketers
Delhi cricketers
Southern Punjab cricketers
Place of birth missing